Peter D. Adkison is an American game designer and businessman who is the founder and first CEO of Wizards of the Coast (1993–2001).

During Adkison's tenure, Wizards of the Coast rose to the status of a major publisher in the hobby game industry. Wizards achieved success with its creation of Magic: the Gathering, which started the collectible card game genre. It also distributed the Pokémon trading cards, and later acquired TSR, publisher of the Dungeons & Dragons role-playing game, releasing a successful new edition.

Adkison is the current owner of Gen Con, a major yearly game convention in the Midwest. In 1999, Adkison sold Wizards of the Coast to Hasbro, remaining with the company until January 2001.

As a longtime fan of role-playing games (RPGs), Adkison has become an advocate for indie RPGs. His own game design work includes The Primal Order, a "capstone system" for use with any of a number of different role-playing games.

Background
As a child, Adkison enjoyed playing strategy games and war games. In 1978, he was exposed to Dungeons & Dragons, which "blew [him] away." His friend, Terry Campbell, suggested the idea of starting a game company to Adkison and his friends using the name "Wizards of the Coast", based on a guild of which one of their player characters was a member.

In the early 1980s, Adkison self-published a wargame for fantasy role-playing games called Castles & Conquest, using the "Wizards of the Coast" brand. In 1981, he created a Dungeons & Dragons campaign titled Chaldea, which he continues to run today.

As of 2002, Adkison was running two Dungeons & Dragons campaigns and playing in three. He enjoys a wide variety of games including Magic: the Gathering, Twitch, The Settlers of Catan, Robo Rally, Call of Cthulhu, Vampire: The Masquerade, and the Legend of the Five Rings Roleplaying Game.

While working at Hidden City Games, his public biography from 2005 claimed that he was married to Melissa Reis Adkison.

In 2014, Adkison married Dee Fenton.

Career
Adkison received a Bachelor of Science degree in Computer Science from Walla Walla College in 1985. He also has a MBA degree from the University of Washington. From 1985 to 1991, he worked as a systems analyst for Boeing.

While working for Boeing, he became involved in the founding of Wizards of the Coast. Adkison suggested to his friend, Ken McGlothlen, that they start a company, and Wizards of the Coast was soon founded on May 23, 1990. The company began working on its first project – Adkison's own The Primal Order – immediately, although it was not released until April 1992. Adkison asked game designer Richard Garfield to develop a game that would be cheaper to produce than Garfield's proposed board game RoboRally; Garfield developed his idea to combine baseball cards with a card game into what would eventually become Magic: The Gathering (1993). With that game's success, Adkison began working full-time for Wizards of the Coast. As TSR was facing financial insolvency, Ryan Dancey of Five Rings Publishing Group brokered a deal for the purchase of TSR and then brought it to Adkison; Wizards of the Coast announced their purchase of TSR on April 10, 1997. Adkison paid about US$30 million for TSR, including payment of debts, and bought Five Rings Publishing as part of the deal. Adkison appointed Mary Kirchoff to manage TSR's book publishing division, and Bill Slavicsek the head of RPG research and development; he also made Lisa Stevens the brand manager for the RPGA and Greyhawk, and put Ryan Dancey in charge of TSR's business and marketing concerns. He improved TSR's relationship with Gary Gygax and Dave Arneson by making favorable financial and legal arrangements with them. Adkison also restored the company's relationship with Margaret Weis, Tracy Hickman, and R.A. Salvatore. Adkison was planning a third edition of Dungeons & Dragons even during the TSR acquisition, and put Bill Slavicsek in charge of the design team, later naming Jonathan Tweet the new leader of the third edition project. Adkison was an old friend of Christian Moore from Last Unicorn Games, and when that company was having its own financial troubles, Wizards of the Coast purchased it in July 2000.

Hasbro purchased Wizards of the Coast in 1999. Adkison began working on a Dungeons & Dragons MMORPG based on a design from Richard Garfield and Skaff Elias. According to game designer Ed Stark, Adkison said, "Look, computer gaming is the future of roleplaying. We've got to get involved in this." However, Hasbro folded up the D&D computer rights into Hasbro Interactive and then sold them to Infogrames, leaving Wizards with no rights to publish D&D computer games; Adkison thus tendered his resignation, effective December 31, 2000. In January 2001, Adkison sold Wizards of the Coast to Hasbro and entered "semi-retirement", engaging in rock-climbing and "lying around". In May 2002, Adkison purchased Gen Con from Hasbro, which he had been attending since 1992. Adkison says he has "always loved" Gen Con.

As of 2005, Adkison is the CEO of Hidden City Games, publishers of the Bella Sara collectible card game for girls. As of 2013, he has started a production company known as Hostile Work Environment LLC.

Accolades
In 1999, Pyramid magazine named Peter Adkison as one of The Millennium's Most Influential Persons "at least in the realm of adventure gaming".

References

External links
 

American chief executives
Dungeons & Dragons game designers
Living people
University of Washington Foster School of Business alumni
Walla Walla University alumni
Year of birth missing (living people)